The 1961 President Airlines Douglas DC-6 crash occurred on the night of September 10, 1961, when a President Airlines Douglas DC-6B named Theodore Roosevelt  outbound from Shannon, Ireland crashed into the nearby River Shannon shortly after takeoff, killing all 83 people on board.  To date, the crash remains the deadliest one in Irish territory.

Aircraft and occupants

The aircraft involved in the accident was a Douglas DC-6B registered N90773.  It first flew in 1953 and was powered by four Pratt & Whitney R-2800 engines.  The aircraft's occupants on the accident flight consisted of 77 passengers and six crew members.
The passengers were mostly German farmers on their way to the U.S. for a three-week study tour.

Accident
The aircraft was on a non-scheduled international passenger flight from Düsseldorf, Germany to Chicago with stopovers in Shannon and Gander, Newfoundland for refueling.  Shortly after takeoff from Shannon Airport's runway 24, the pilots were cleared for a right-hand turn, but they instead turned left and kept turning until the aircraft had reached a bank angle of about 90 degrees or more.  Unable to recover, the aircraft plummeted into the River Shannon 5,000 ft. from the end of the runway.  There were no survivors among the 83 passengers and crew.  Subsequent investigations indicate that the crash probably resulted from a malfunctioning attitude indicator, a fault in the starboard ailerons, or both.  Poor weather conditions and crew fatigue were also cited as possible contributing factors.

See also
Air India Flight 855 – another accident in which the attitude indicator failed, causing the pilot to bank too far to the left and lose control.
Korean Air Flight 8509
Copa Flight 201 
West Air Sweden Flight 294

References

External links
A photo of the accident aircraft, taken one week before the accident
 Video of President Airlines Douglas crash at Shannon  Clare Herald

1961 in Ireland
Accidents and incidents involving the Douglas DC-6
Airliner accidents and incidents caused by instrument failure
Airliner accidents and incidents caused by pilot error
Airliner accidents and incidents caused by weather
Aviation accidents and incidents in 1961
Aviation accidents and incidents in Ireland
September 1961 events in Europe
1961 in the Republic of Ireland